The Spitalfields Historic Buildings Trust, also known as the Spitalfields Trust, is a British architectural conservation charity. It originated in the Spitalfields area of London, although it also operates elsewhere in England and Wales. The trust's founders include the architectural historians Mark Girouard and Colin Amery and the art historian and television presenter Dan Cruickshank.

The Spitalfields Historic Buildings Trust was founded in 1977 to rescue the remaining Georgian houses in Spitalfields, London, which were threatened with demolition by the expansion of  London's financial district. The trust's work was important in the preservation of the network of early 18th-century streets in the area. The trust is largely funded by grants from English Heritage and Cadw, and by loans from the Architectural Heritage Fund.

The trust's work has been criticised as leading to the gentrification of Spitalfields, changing a working-class area into "a gentrified enclave for writers, historians and the like", who are "all predominantly white European".

List of buildings restored by the trust

Other buildings with which the trust has been involved
Malplaquet House, Stepney, London
Dennis Severs' House, Spitalfields, London

References

Further reading

See also
 The Georgian Group

External links
Official website

Charities based in London
Heritage organisations in the United Kingdom
Conservation in the United Kingdom
Architectural history
Spitalfields
Building Preservation Trusts